Sheverli (Şewerle; , Şĕvĕrlĕ) is a rural locality (a village) in Semyonkinsky Selsoviet, Aurgazinsky District, Bashkortostan, Russia. The population was 360 as of 2010. There are 7 streets.

Geography 
Sheverli is located 33 km southwest of Tolbazy (the district's administrative centre) by road. Shlandy is the nearest rural locality.

References 

Rural localities in Aurgazinsky District